The 1926 Coupe de France Final was a football match held at Stade Olympique, Colombes on May 9, 1926, that saw Olympique de Marseille defeat AS Valentigney 4–1 thanks to goals by Jules Dewaquez (2), Douglas De Ruymbecke and Jean Boyer.

Match details

See also
Coupe de France 1925-1926

External links
Coupe de France results at Rec.Sport.Soccer Statistics Foundation
Report on French federation site

Coupe De France Final
1926
Coupe De France Final 1926
Sport in Hauts-de-Seine
Coupe de France Final
Coupe de France Final